Sticta viviana is a species of corticolous (bark-dwelling), foliose lichen in the family Peltigeraceae. It is found in Colombia, where it grows on the branches and twigs of shrubs and treelets in high-elevation páramo habitat.

Taxonomy

The lichen was formally described as a new species in 2013 by Alejandra Suárez and Robert Lücking. The species epithet honours Colombian lichenologist Bibiana Moncada ("viviana" is the original form of the name Bibiana), who collected the type during her studies on the systematics and phylogeny of Sticta in Colombia.

The similar species Sticta fuliginosa can be distinguished from Sticta viviana by several characteristics. S. viviana has smaller thallus  with a shiny, pitted surface, and has clustered, knob-like projections called corymbose isidia. It also has a dark lower layer of fine hairs called , and its small, usually stemless, vase-shaped pores called cyphellae have one small protrusion per cell at the bottom. Finally, its medulla does not change colour when treated with potassium hydroxide (K−). Sticta viviana is a species that has a similar appearance to S. fuliginosa, with broad, rounded lobes and laminal isidia. In traditional identification methods, it would have been classified as part of the S. fuliginosa group, as there are over 15 species that share this general morphology. Modern molecular phylogenetic methods have shown that there are several distinct species sharing the name associated by this gross morphology.

Description

The upper surface of the lobes is dark brown and shiny, with a bumpy texture towards the tips. There are small, stick-like growths called isidia on the surface. It is covered by a primary , which is dense and thick except towards the margin. The primary tomentum is made up of soft, brown hairs that are 340–430 μm long and clustered in bundles of 12–20 branched hyphae. These hyphae have free,  apices. There is also a secondary tomentum, which is thinly  and cream-colored to beige. It is formed by solitary hyphae that are 7–23 μm long and have free, septate apices.

This lichen does not have rhizines. Instead, it has sparse cyphellae on both the center and margins of the thallus. They are sessile to suprasessile, which means that the basal membrane is at or above the level of the lower , and the cyphellae margin is basally constricted. The margins of the cyphellae are erect to slightly involute and are cream-colored to golden brown. The basal membrane of the cyphellae, which covers the medulla, is white.

Sticta aymara has some similarities to S. viviana: characteristics such as small thalli size, the presence of isidia, and absence of apothecia unite these two species. However, S. aymara has a dark brown, scrobiculate (covered with small, shallow pits) to faveolate (with small, depressed, and pit-like structures) upper surface with cream-coloured maculae (small, flat patches or spots on the surface).

Habitat and distribution

Sticta viviana is an epiphytic lichen species that grows on the branches and twigs of shrubs and treelets in the páramo habitat. It is usually found in areas that are rather exposed to light. The paramo is a high-altitude ecosystem found in the northern Andes, which includes the mountainous regions of Venezuela, Colombia, Ecuador, Peru, and Bolivia. The habitat preference of Sticta viviana is likely influenced by the unique environmental conditions found in the páramo.

References

viviana
Lichen species
Lichens described in 2013
Lichens of Colombia
Taxa named by Robert Lücking